Caladenia infundibularis, commonly known as the funnel-web spider orchid is a species of orchid endemic to the  south-west of Western Australia. It has a single hairy leaf and up to three greenish-yellow flowers which have a red-tipped labellum.

Description
Flowering occurs in October and November.

Taxonomy and naming
Caladenia infundibularis was first formally described by Alex George in 1984 and the description was published in Nuytsia from a specimen found near Augusta. The specific epithet (infundibularis) is a Latin word meaning "funnel-shaped", referring to the shape of the base of the labellum.

Distribution and habitat 
The funnel-web spider orchid occurs between Dunsborough and Northcliffe in the Jarrah Forest, Swan Coastal Plain and Warren biogeographic regions where it grows in coastal heath, forest and woodland.

Conservation
Caladenia infundibularis is classified as "Not Threatened" by the Western Australian Government Department of Parks and Wildlife.

References

infundibularis
Orchids of Western Australia
Endemic orchids of Australia
Plants described in 1984
Endemic flora of Western Australia